Four-Day Trials is a 1999 album by American indie/roots folk band Dispatch. The album was their third studio release. The tracks "Here We Go" and "Mission" are re-recordings of tracks from Dispatch's second album, Bang Bang.

Track listing
"What Do You Wanna Be" (Urmston)
"Bullet Holes" (Heimbold)
"Wide Right Turns" (Urmston)
"Here We Go" (Urmston)
"Cover This" (Urmston)
"Mission" (Urmston and Heimbold)
"Hubs" (Heimbold)
"Root Down" (Beastie Boys Cover)
"Headlights" (Heimbold)

Remastered version
A later remastered reissue of the album released in 2004 included the following bonus tracks after "Headlights":
"Fats" (Dispatch)
"Whaddya Wanna Be" (Dispatch)
"Dem Shoes" (Dispatch)

Personnel
Brad Corrigan - vocals, drums
Chad Urmston - vocals, guitar, bass
Pete Heimbold - vocals, bass, guitar

References

1999 albums
Dispatch albums